Harunur Rashid (born 1 January 1962) is a Bangladesh Nationalist Party politician and the incumbent Jatiya Sangsad member from the Chapai Nawabganj-3 constituency since January 2019.

Career
Rashid was elected to Jatiya Sangsad from Chapai Nawabganj-3 in the June 1996 Bangladeshi general election as a candidate of Bangladesh Nationalist Party. He had received 77,929 votes while his nearest rival, Latifur Rahman of Awami League, had received 47,048 votes.

Rashid was re-elected to the same position in the 2001 Bangladeshi general election. He had received 85,489 votes while the same rival, Latifur Rahman of Awami League, had received 60,460 votes.

Rashid contested the 2008 Bangladeshi general election from Chapai Nawabganj-3 as the Bangladesh Nationalist Party candidate but lost to Abdul Odud of Awami League. He received 76,178 votes while the winner received 112,753 votes. Latifur Rahman of Bangladesh Jamaat-e-Islami also campaigned against him.

In November 2011, Rashid participated in a human chain protesting erosion at the Chapainawabganj Press Club.

Rashid boycotted the 2014 election as per decision of the Bangladesh Nationalist Party and Abdul Odud of Awami League was elected to parliament uncontested from Chapai Nawabganj-3.

Rashid was elected to parliament from Chapai Nawabganj-3 as a Bangladesh Nationalist Party candidate on 30 December 2018. He had received 133,661 votes while Abdul Odul of Awami League and his nearest rival received 85,938 votes. He took the oath of office 90 days after the mandated time following instructions of Tarique Rahman. The four Bangladesh Nationalist Party members of parliament initially refused to join parliament as they had deemed the election unfair.

Rashid in parliament asked the speaker to create a committee to investigate the large number of cases filed against Bangladesh Nationalist Party politicians.

Charges and convictions
Assistant director Monayem Hossain of the Anti-Corruption Commission filed a case against Rashid for tax fraud in March 2007 with Tejgaon police station and then pressed charge in July. Rashid had imported a Hummer H2 on 25 April 2005 without paying tax as per his privilege as a member of parliament but later sold the to Ishtiak Sadek, violating the rules of the duty free facility, who sold it to Enayetur Rahman Bappi. The car, imported under duty free privilege, cannot be sold under less than years of being purchased. Rapid Action Battalion-2, commanded by Lieutenant Colonel Akbar Hossain, had spotted the Hummer in Panthapath and asked the men to come to their camp where they were detained.

In October 2019, Judge Shaikh Nazmul Alam of the Dhaka court sentenced Rashid to five years’ imprisonment for dodging taxes while importing a luxurious car in 2007 and fined him five million taka. It also sent his co-accused former managing director of NTV and Channel 9, Enayetur Rahman Bappi, to two years imprisonment. His other co-accused proprietor of Sky Autos, Ishtiak Sadek, sentenced to jail for three years.  A week later, the High Court granted him six months’ bail in the case.

Justices Obaidul Hassan and AKM Zahirul Huq asked the government to explain why Rashid's parliamentary membership should not be canceled due to his conviction.

On 9 December 2021, Justice Md Selim of Bangladesh High court upheld the verdict in the tax evasion case against Rashid after hearing his appeal. The High Court commuted his sentence to time served.

Personal life
Rashid is married to Syeda Asifa Ashrafi Papia.

References

Living people
1962 births
People from Chapai Nawabganj district
University of Rajshahi alumni
Bangladesh Nationalist Party politicians
6th Jatiya Sangsad members
7th Jatiya Sangsad members
8th Jatiya Sangsad members
11th Jatiya Sangsad members
Place of birth missing (living people)